The Shire of Quairading is a local government area in the Wheatbelt region of Western Australia, about  east of the state capital, Perth.

History

Quairading was initially constituted as the Greenhills Road District on 15 December 1892, covering a large area east of York. The district was broken up on 14 February 1913, with Greenhills renamed the Avon Road District and large parts of the former district separated as the new East Avon Road District and Kunjinn Road District.

The Avon Road District was renamed to the Quairading Road District on 12 May 1922. On 1 July 1961, it became a shire as the Shire of Quairading under the 
Local Government Act 1960, which reformed all remaining road districts into shires.

Wards
The Shire is no longer divided into wards and the nine councillors sit at large. Prior to the 2003 elections, there were eleven councillors representing five wards: Town (3), Southwest, Southeast, Northwest and Northeast (2 each).

Towns and localities
The towns and localities of the Shire of Quairading with population and size figures based on the most recent Australian census:

Population

Heritage-listed places

As of 2023, 233 places are heritage-listed in the Shire of Quairading, of which seven are on the State Register of Heritage Places.

References

External links
 

 
Quairading